Mathematics competitions or mathematical olympiads are competitive events where participants complete a math test. These tests may require multiple choice or numeric answers, or a detailed written solution or proof.

International mathematics competitions
 Championnat International de Jeux Mathématiques et Logiques — for all ages, mainly for French-speaking countries, but participation is not limited by language.
 China Girls Mathematical Olympiad (CGMO) — held annually for teams of girls representing different regions within China and a few other countries.
 European Girls' Mathematical Olympiad (EGMO) — since April 2012
 Integration Bee — competition in integral calculus held in various institutions of higher learning in the United States and some other countries
 Interdisciplinary Contest in Modeling (ICM) — team contest for undergraduates
 International Mathematical Modeling Challenge — team contest for high school students
 International Mathematical Olympiad (IMO) — the oldest international Olympiad, occurring annually since 1959.
 International Mathematics Competition for University Students (IMC) — international competition for undergraduate students. 
 Mathematical Contest in Modeling (MCM) — team contest for undergraduates
 Mathematical Kangaroo — worldwide competition.
 Mental Calculation World Cup — contest for the best mental calculators
 Primary Mathematics World Contest (PMWC) — worldwide competition
 Rocket City Math League (RCML) — Competition run by students at Virgil I. Grissom High School with levels ranging from Explorer (Pre-Algebra) to Discovery (Comprehensive)
 Romanian Master of Mathematics and Sciences — Olympiad for the selection of the top 20 countries in the last IMO.
 Tournament of the Towns — worldwide competition.

Regional mathematics competitions
 Asian Pacific Mathematics Olympiad (APMO) — Pacific rim
 Balkan Mathematical Olympiad — for students from Balkan area
 Baltic Way — Baltic area
 ICAS-Mathematics (formerly Australasian Schools Mathematics Assessment)
 Mediterranean Mathematics Competition. Olympiad for countries in the Mediterranean zone.
 Nordic Mathematical Contest (NMC) — the five Nordic countries
 North East Asian Mathematics Competition (NEAMC) — North-East Asia
 Pan African Mathematics Olympiads (PAMO)
 South East Asian Mathematics Competition (SEAMC) — South-East Asia
 William Lowell Putnam Mathematical Competition — United States and Canada

National mathematics olympiads

Australia
 Australian Mathematics Competition

Bangladesh
 Bangladesh Mathematical Olympiad (Jatio Gonit Utshob)

Belgium
 Olympiade Mathématique Belge — competition for French-speaking students in Belgium
 Vlaamse Wiskunde Olympiade — competition for Dutch-speaking students in Belgium

Brazil
 Olimpíada Brasileira de Matemática (OBM) — national competition open to all students from sixth grade to university
 Olimpíada Brasileira de Matemática das Escolas Públicas (OBMEP) — national competition open to public-school students from fourth grade to high school

Canada

 Canadian Open Mathematics Challenge — Canada's premier national mathematics competition open to any student with an interest in and grasp of high school math and organised by Canadian Mathematical Society
 Canadian Mathematical Olympiad — competition whose top performers represent Canada at the International Mathematical Olympiad 
 The Centre for Education in Mathematics and Computing (CEMC) based out of the University of Waterloo hosts long-standing national competitions for grade levels 7–12
 MathChallengers (formerly MathCounts BC) — for eighth, ninth, and tenth grade students

France
 Concours général — competition whose mathematics portion is open to twelfth grade students

Hong Kong
 Hong Kong Mathematics Olympiad
 Hong Kong Mathematical High Achievers Selection Contest — for students from Form 1 to Form 3
 Pui Ching Invitational Mathematics Competition
 Primary Mathematics World Contest

Hungary
 Miklós Schweitzer Competition
 Középiskolai Matematikai Lapok — correspondence competition for students from 9th–12th grade
 National Secondary School Academic Competition - Mathematics

India
Indian National Mathematical Olympiad

Indonesia
National Science Olympiad (Olimpiade Sains Nasional) — includes mathematics along with various science topics

Kenya
Moi National Mathematics Contest — prepared and hosted by Mang'u High School but open to students from all Kenyan high schools

Nigeria
 Cowbellpedia. This contest is sponsored by Promasidor Nigeria. It is open to students from eight to eighteen, at public and private schools in Nigeria.

Saudi Arabia
 KFUPM mathematics olympiad – organized by King Fahd University of Petroleum and Minerals (KFUPM).

Singapore
 Singapore Mathematical Olympiad (SMO) — organized by the Singapore Mathematical Society, the competition is open to all pre-university students in Singapore.

South Africa
University of Cape Town Mathematics Competition — open to students in grades 8 through 12 in the Western Cape province.

United States

National elementary school competitions (K–5) and higher
 Math League (grades 4–12)
 Mathematical Olympiads for Elementary and Middle Schools (MOEMS) (grades 4–6 and 7–8)

National middle school competitions (grades 6–8) and lower/higher
 American Mathematics Contest 8 (AMC->8), formerly the American Junior High School Mathematics Examination (AJHSME)
 Math League (grades 4–12)
 MATHCOUNTS
 Mathematical Olympiads for Elementary and Middle Schools (MOEMS)
 Rocket City Math League (pre-algebra to calculus)
 United States of America Mathematical Talent Search (USAMTS)

National high school competitions (grade 9–12) and lower
 American Invitational Mathematics Examination (AIME)
 American Mathematics Contest 10 (AMC10)
 American Mathematics Contest 12 (AMC12), formerly the American High School Mathematics Examination (AHSME)
 American Regions Mathematics League (ARML)
 Harvard-MIT Mathematics Tournament (HMMT)
 iTest
 High School Mathematical Contest in Modeling (HiMCM)
 Math League (grades 4–12)
 Math-O-Vision (grades 9–12)
 Math Prize for Girls
 MathWorks Math Modeling Challenge
 Mu Alpha Theta
 United States of America Mathematical Olympiad (USAMO)
 United States of America Mathematical Talent Search (USAMTS)
 Rocket City Math League (pre-algebra to calculus)

National college competitions
 AMATYC Mathematics Contest
 Mathematical Contest in Modeling (MCM)
 William Lowell Putnam Mathematical Competition

Regional competitions

References

Competitions
 
Mathematics